Jana jeanae is a moth in the family Eupterotidae. It was described by Stoneham in 1966. It is found in South Africa.

References

Moths described in 1966
Janinae
Moths of Africa